Cnesteboda haruspex is a species of moth of the family Tortricidae. It is found in Sri Lanka.

The wingspan is 14–15 mm. The forewings are deep brown-reddish or dull crimson, sometimes greyish-tinged, obscurely darker-strigulated. The costa is dark fuscous, spotted with ferruginous-ochreous. The hindwings are dark grey. Adults have been recorded on wing in April and October.

References

Moths described in 1912
Tortricini
Moths of Sri Lanka
Taxa named by Edward Meyrick